Bursa BBSK Women’s Volleyball is the women's volleyball department of Turkish sports club Bursa Büyükşehir Belediyespor based in Bursa. The team plays in the Turkish Women's Volleyball League, the top professional league in Turkey with home matches played at the Cengiz Göllü Sports Hall. The team has also participated in European competitions, winning the CEV Challenge Cup in the 2014–15 and 2016–17 editions.

Honours

International competitions
  CEV Women's Challenge Cup
 Champions (2): 2014–15; 2016–17

International frendlly competitions
  Plovdiv Cup
 Champions (3): 2013, 2014, 2017

Team squad

Season 2017–2018, as of October 2017.

See also
 Turkish women in sports

References

External links
 Official Bursa BBSK Website 
 Turkish Volleyball Federation Official Website 

Volleyball
Sport in Bursa
Women's volleyball teams in Turkey